"UFO" is a song by Australian musician Mallrat featuring Australian rapper Allday. It was released on 9 February 2018 as the second single from Mallrat's second EP In the Sky.

Upon released of the EP, Mallrat said "'UFO'  is about feeling like an alien. I don't know how to explain it. Like, I'm sure everybody feels like this sometimes, I don't feel as if I'm like any of these people. I love all of these people but there's just something that feels very different. I think I could be from another planet, maybe that's the only logical explanation."

The song was voted number 70 on the Triple J Hottest 100, 2018.

Reception
Al Newstead from ABC called the song a "glorious pop sunbeam" calling the song "a different side to her sound, showing off her vocals with a more introspective lyric and a hazy slow-rap backing to match."

Certifications

References

2018 songs
2018 singles
Mallrat songs
Allday songs
Male–female vocal duets
Songs written by Mallrat
Songs written by Allday